Harvest of Hate is a 1978 Australian film made for TV about Arab terrorists operating in South Australia.

Plot
A young couple is captured by Arab terrorists in the Simpson Desert.

Production
The film was shot over three weeks in South Australia in July to August 1977. It was directed by Michael Thornhill who said it "was a gun-for-hire job. I didn't complete the film. They re-edited and I just walked away."

References

External links

Harvest of Hate at Peter Malone Site
Harvest of Hate at Oz Movies
Harvest of Hate at TCMDB
Harvest of Hate at SAFC

1978 television films
1978 films
Australian television films
Films about terrorism
Films produced by Jane Scott
1970s English-language films
Films directed by Michael Thornhill